Plandome Manor is a village in Nassau County, on the North Shore of Long Island, in New York, United States. The majority of the village is considered part of the Greater Manhasset area, which is anchored by Manhasset. The easternmost part of the village is more closely associated with Port Washington. The population was 872 at the 2010 census.

The Incorporated Village of Plandome Manor is in the Town of North Hempstead, and is the northernmost of the three Plandomes.

History
The Village of Plandome Manor incorporated in 1931. Like the villages of Plandome and Plandome Heights to its south, Plandome Manor derives its name from the Latin 'Planus Domus', meaning plain, or level home. The manor house of Matthias Nicoll who was an early mayor of New York City and among the first generation of the Nicoll family on Long Island, was a wood-frame home built in the 1670s, and one of the first homesteads in this area of Cow Neck, the namesake of the Cow Neck Peninsula (also known as the Manhasset/Port Washington Peninsula). The manor itself was torn down in 1998 and replaced with another estate.

Author Frances H. Burnett, author of The Secret Garden, built her home, Fairseat, in Plandome Park in 1908, and lived there until her death in 1924. Burnett's son, Vivian, and his wife Constance, had erected a home nearby on Bayview Road after their marriage. Following Frances Burnett's death, her nephew, publisher Archer P. Fahnestock moved into Fairseat, but the home burned down leaving only the stucco carriage house and garden intact. In 1940, Fahnestock sold it to Leroy Grumman.

Geography 

Plandome Manor is located within the Leeds Pond Subwatershed (part of the Manhasset Bay Watershed), and is located within the larger Long Island Sound/Atlantic Ocean Watershed.

Demographics 

As of the census of 2000, there were 838 people, 281 households, and 241 families residing in the village. The population density was 1,637.6 people per square mile (634.4/km2). There were 288 housing units at an average density of 562.8 per square mile (218.0/km2). The racial makeup of the village was 92.12% White, 0.36% African American, 5.49% Asian, 0.84% from other races, and 1.19% from two or more races. Hispanic or Latino of any race were 2.27% of the population.

There were 281 households, out of which 42.3% had children under the age of 18 living with them, 80.4% were married couples living together, 3.2% had a female householder with no husband present, and 13.9% were non-families. Of all households 12.8% were made up of individuals, and 8.9% had someone living alone who was 65 years of age or older. The average household size was 2.98 and the average family size was 3.24.

In the village, the population was spread out, with 28.2% under the age of 18, 4.5% from 18 to 24, 23.4% from 25 to 44, 26.8% from 45 to 64, and 17.1% who were 65 years of age or older. The median age was 42 years. For every 100 females, there were 91.8 males. For every 100 females age 18 and over, there were 90.5 males.

The median income for a household in the village was $176,959, and the median income for a family was $193,496. Males had a median income of $100,000 versus $69,583 for females. The per capita income for the village was $77,276. About 2.0% of families and 2.2% of the population were below the poverty line, including 2.1% of those under age 18 and none of those age 65 or over.

Government

Government 
As of June 2021, the Mayor of Plandome Manor is Barbara Donno, the Deputy Mayor of Plandome Manor is Matthew Clinton, and the Trustees of Plandome Manor are James Baydar, Matthew Clinton, Tony DeSousa, and Patricia O’Neill.

Representation in higher government

Town representation 
Plandome Manor is located in the Town of North Hempstead's 6th council district, which as of September 2022 is represented on the North Hempstead Town Council by Mariann Dalimonte (D–Port Washington).

Nassau County representation 
Plandome Manor is located in Nassau County's 9th Legislative district, which as of November 2021 is represented in the Nassau County Legislature by Richard Nicoello (R–New Hyde Park).

New York State representation

New York State Assembly 
Plandome Manor is located within the New York State Assembly's 16th Assembly district, which as of November 2021 is represented by Gina Sillitti (D–Manorhaven).

New York State Senate 
Plandome Manor is located in the New York State Senate's 7th State Senate district, which as of November 2021 is represented in the New York State Senate by Anna Kaplan (D–North Hills).

Federal representation

United States Congress 
Plandome Manor is located in New York's 3rd congressional district, which as of November 2021 is represented in the United States Congress by Tom Suozzi (D–Glen Cove).

United States Senate 
Like the rest of New York, Plandome Manor is represented in the United States Senate by Charles Schumer (D) and Kirsten Gillibrand (D).

Politics 
In the 2016 U.S. presidential election, the majority of Plandome Manor voters voted for Donald Trump (R).

Education

School districts 
Plandome Manor is primarily located with the boundaries of (and is thus served by) the Manhasset Union Free School District. However, most of the eastern portion of the village is served by the Port Washington Union Free School District. As such, students who reside within Plandome Manor and attend public schools go to school in one of these two districts, depending on where in Plandome Manor they live.

Library districts 
Plandome Manor is within the boundaries of the Manhasset Library District and the Port Washington Library District. The boundaries for these districts within Plandome Manor roughly correspond with those of the respective school districts.

Parks and recreation 
Located within the village boundaries, taking almost a third of the village, is the private members club, Plandome Country Club. The club opened in 1931 as the Plandome Golf Club. The owner's purchased the land from the Leeds family, which owned a nearby estate. They originally intended to build a major residential development but changed the plans to instead build a golf course, in part due to the Stock Market Crash in 1929.Architect Orrin Smith was responsible for designing the golf course. The Plandome Golf Club became the Plandome Country Club in 1955. A major fire broke out in the clubhouse during a snowstorm during the night hours on December 23, 1958. The clubhouse was damaged beyond repair and was replaced with the current building around 1959. The new clubhouse was designed by architect Manoug Exerjian.

Also within the village is the Nassau County-maintained Leeds Pond Preserve, which is home to the Science Museum of Long Island.

Infrastructure

Transportation

Road 
Major roads in Plandome Manor include North Plandome Road, Plandome Road, and Stonytown Road.

Rail 

The Plandome station on the Long Island Rail Road's Port Washington Branch is the nearest train station to the village. It is located primarily within the adjacent village of Plandome, with the northern extremes of the platform being within Plandome Manor. There is a parking lot at the station reserved exclusively for Plandome Manor residents, and a walkway exists between the station and Circle Drive.

Utilities

Natural gas 
National Grid USA provides natural gas to homes and businesses that are hooked up to natural gas lines in Plandome Manor.

Power 
PSEG Long Island provides power to all homes and businesses within Plandome Manor.

Sewage 
Plandome Manor is not connected to any sanitary sewer systems. As such, all areas within the village rely on cesspools and septic systems.

Trash collection 
As of 2019, trash collection services in Plandome Manor are provided by Meadow Carting, under contract with the Village of Plandome Manor.

Water 
Plandome Manor is located primarily within the boundaries of the Manhasset–Lakeville Water District, although a small portion of the easternmost section of the village is within the boundaries of and is served by the Port Washington Water District.

Notable people 
 Ray Bolger (1904–1987), actor (The Wizard of Oz)
 Frances Hodgson Burnett (1849–1924), playwright, author, wrote The Secret Garden while living in Plandome Manor.
 Leroy Grumman (1895–1982), co-founder, Grumman Aerospace Corp.
 Virginia Portia Royall Inness-Brown (1901–1990), proponent of the arts, socialite.
 Martin W. Littleton (1872–1934), Brooklyn Congressman, D.A., and Borough President, attorney for Harry Thaw's second trial for murder of Stanford White.
 Samuel Latham Mitchill (1764–1830), U.S. Senator, physician, professor at Columbia College.
 William Fellowes Morgan, Jr.  (1889–1977), commissioner of the Dept. of Markets of the City of New York.
 Matthias Nicoll (1630–1687), Mayor of New York 1672–1674, Speaker of the first Colonial Assembly.
 John Hay Whitney (1904–1982), U.S. Ambassador, publisher, horse breeder, socialite.

References

External links 

 Official website

Manhasset, New York
Populated coastal places in New York (state)
Villages in Nassau County, New York
Villages in New York (state)